Tuan Muhamad Faim Bin Tuan Zainal Abidin (born 21 July 1991) is a Malaysian professional footballer who currently a free agent. He is a defender who can operate as a right back.

Club career

Kelantan FA
Faim began his football career playing for Kelantan FA President's Cup team before promoted to senior team in 2012.

MOF F.C.
In May 2016, Faim joined Malaysia FAM League club MOF F.C. on loan deal until the end of the season.

Club statistics
As of 25 September 2016.

References

External links
 

Malaysian footballers
Kelantan FA players
MOF F.C. players
People from Kota Bharu
People from Kelantan
Malaysia Super League players
Association football defenders
1991 births
Living people
Malaysian people of Malay descent